Matanglawin (Baybayin:) is a weekly science-environmental educational show hosted by Kim Atienza, popularly known as Kuya Kim. Matanglawin tackling on various subjects. It is aired on ABS-CBN every Sunday mornings at 9:45 am, with replays on Wednesday mornings and daily on Knowledge Channel, Tuesdays at 2:00 pm and Wednesdays at 1:00 am on DZMM TeleRadyo and Wednesdays at 7:00 am on Jeepney TV. The show premiered on March 24, 2008 as a late-night program before it was moved to its current time schedule.

From May 3, 2020, the show has been temporarily suspended airings due to the temporary closure of ABS-CBN because of the cease and desist order of the National Telecommunications Commission (NTC), following the expiration of the network's 25-year franchise granted in 1995 and ultimately cancelled due to the denial of the franchise and retrenchments of employees. Re-runs of the show are seen on Knowledge Channel via Extracurricular subject, and on A2Z every weekends under Kidz Weekend block. The show eventually did not go back on-air as Kuya Kim transferred to GMA Network on October 4, 2021.

Overview
The show defines Kuya Kim takes on the vantage point of a Philippine hawk - Mapanuri, Mapagmatiyag, Mapangahas! (Inquisitive, Vigilant, Adventurous!) - as he takes on the role of an explorer in search of new, interesting trivia, legends to demystify.

Hosts
Final host
 Kim Atienza

Featured guest co-hosts
 Myrtle Sarrosa
 Jessy Mendiola
 Melai Cantiveros
 Teddy Corpuz
 Jugs Jugueta
 Jayson Gainza
 Jeffrey Tam
 Ryan Bang
 Robi Domingo
 Gretchen Ho
 Krissha Viaje
 Sammie Rimando

Batanglawin
 Nash Aguas
 Basty Alcances

Matanglawin cameos
 Eric "Eruption" Tai
 Drew Arellano
 Iya Villania
 Jolina Magdangal
 Marvin Agustin
 Gerald Anderson
 Rayver Cruz
 Nikki Gil
 Maja Salvador

Awards and nominations

See also
 Knowledge Power
 Umagang Kay Ganda
 ABS-CBN
 List of programs broadcast by ABS-CBN
 ABS-CBN News and Current Affairs

References

External links

ABS-CBN original programming
ABS-CBN News and Current Affairs shows
Philippine educational television series
2008 Philippine television series debuts
Filipino-language television shows